Mead Hall Episcopal School is a private, 3K–12 coeducational college preparatory school located over two campuses in Aiken, South Carolina. Previously covering grades 3K–8, the school expanded to cover high school grades when they acquired Aiken Preparatory School during the summer of 2012.

History

Aiken Prep
Aiken Prep was founded in 1916 by Louise Hitchcock, wife of American polo pioneer Thomas Hitchcock and mother of international polo star Tommy Hitchcock, Jr. For most of its existence, Aiken Prep was a junior boys' boarding school for grades 4–9. In 1989, through a merger with the Aiken Day School, the school transitioned to move toward a day school format. During the summer of 2012, Aiken Preparatory School merged with Mead Hall Episcopal School. While the campus will be referred to as the 'Aiken Prep' campus, Aiken Preparatory School is now officially known as Mead Hall Episcopal School.

In May 2012, Aiken Preparatory School's board of trustees voted to sell the school's facilities to Mead Hall Episcopal Day School.

References

External links

Schools in Aiken County, South Carolina
Private high schools in South Carolina
Private middle schools in South Carolina
Private elementary schools in South Carolina
Episcopal schools in the United States
Buildings and structures in Aiken, South Carolina